Peaceful Village (also known as Peaceful) is a village in Jefferson County, Missouri, United States. As of the 2010 census, Peaceful Village had a population of nine.

Geography

Demographics

2010 census
As of the census of 2010, there were 9 people, 4 households, and 3 families residing in the village. The racial makeup of the village was 100.0% White.

There were 4 households, of which 25.0% were married couples living together, 50.0% had a female householder with no husband present, and 25.0% were non-families. 25.0% of all households were made up of individuals, and 25% had someone living alone who was 65 years of age or older. The average household size was 2.25 and the average family size was 2.33.

The median age in the village was 44.5 years. 0.0% of residents were under the age of 18; 22.2% were between the ages of 18 and 24; 33.3% were from 25 to 44; 11.1% were from 45 to 64; and 33.3% were 65 years of age or older. The gender makeup of the village was 33.3% male and 66.7% female.

References

Villages in Jefferson County, Missouri
Villages in Missouri
Populated places established in 2008
2008 establishments in Missouri